Struck Island is an island in Alexandra Bay about  north of the mouth of the Daintree River in Queensland, Australia, some  north of Port Douglas. It is administered by the Great Barrier Reef Marine Park Authority and the Queensland Parks and Wildlife Service. It's very little in size. It's just 1 hectares or 0.01 square km in size.

Struck Island is in the Daintree National Park about a kilometre from Thornton Beach.

Aboriginal culture
The KuKu Yananji have a tribal belief that Thornton Beach is a place which can stimulate fertility.  It was once the practice for the young women of the tribe to spend time on Thornton Beach before they went to an offshore island (Struck Island) to receive their tribal scars and other marks of womanhood and marriageability."

References

Islands on the Great Barrier Reef